William Collings may refer to:
 William Collings (politician), member of the Legislative Assembly of Ontario
 William Thomas Collings,  Church of England clergyman and seigneur of Sark
 William Frederick Collings, his son, seigneur of Sark
 Billy Collings, Scottish footballer
 Bill Collings, founder of Collings Guitars